The Hits is a compilation album from REO Speedwagon. It contains hits such as "Can't Fight This Feeling" and "Keep on Loving You", as well as new tracks "Here with Me" and "I Don't Want to Lose You". "Here with Me" cracked the top 20 on the Billboard Hot 100. and the top ten on the Adult Contemporary chart; however, it would be the last single to feature drummer Alan Gratzer and guitarist Gary Richrath, as they each left the band within the year following this album's release. The album has sold over 4 million copies in the U.S. which led it to go 4× Platinum.

A conspicuous absentee from the album is "Keep the Fire Burnin', which reached #7 on the Billboard Hot 100 in 1982. The collection is one of several released by the band's label. The album was remastered and reissued in 2002. The album was also re-released in 2020 on black and white vinyl.

Cash Box called "Here with Me" a "power ballad that lifts you up where you belong, a majestic and sweeping effort that has romanticism, leavened with pop sensibility."  Cash Box called "I Don't Want to Lose You" a "hard-driving, corporate-sounding rocker."

Track listing

Personnel 

REO Speedwagon
 Kevin Cronin – lead vocals, rhythm guitars, keyboards
 Gary Richrath – lead guitars
 Neal Doughty – keyboards, synthesizers
 Gregg Philbin – bass, backing vocals 
 Bruce Hall – bass, backing vocals 
 Alan Gratzer – drums, backing vocals

Additional personnel<ref>{{cite book|title=REO Speedwagon The Hits - "I Don't Want to Lose You" and "Here with Me"|year=1988|publisher=Sony Music Entertainment|pages=3}}</ref>
 Tommy Funderburk – backing vocals 
 Eric Persing – additional synthesizers, programming

Production 
 Keith Olsen – producer (1, 2)
 Kevin Cronin – producer (3-9, 11, 12, 13)
 Gary Richrath – producer (3-9, 11-14)
 Paul Grupp – producer (3, 11)
 John Boylan – executive producer (3, 11)
 Kevin Beemish – producer (4, 6, 8, 13)
 Alan Gratzer – co-producer (4, 6, 8), producer (5, 7, 9, 12), associate producer (13)
 David DeVore – producer (5, 7), production assistant (9, 12), package assembling, mastering 
 John Stronach – producer (10, 14)
 Gary Lubow – production assistant (13)
 John Henning – producer (14)
 Joe Gastwirt – engineer 
 Steve Hall – mastering 
 Tony Lane – art direction 
 Nancy Donald – art direction
 David Coleman – design 
 Harry Mittman – photography 
 Dennis Keeley – inner sleeve photography 
 Malcolm Dome – liner notes 
 Baruck-Consolo Managerment – management 

Studios
 Recorded and Assembled at Pacific Studios (Chatsworth, California).
 Mastered at Future Disc (North Hollywood, California).

Charts and certifications

Album

Singles

Certifications

Album catalog numbers
Original 1988 release: Epic Records OE/OET/EK 44202
2002 remastered CD release: Epic Records EK 86518

Notes 

1988 greatest hits albums
REO Speedwagon albums
Epic Records compilation albums